Budelli is an island in the Maddalena archipelago, near the strait of Bonifacio in northern Sardinia, Italy. It is one of the seven islands that comprise Arcipelago di La Maddalena National Park.

Geography 
Budelli is several hundred metres south of the islands of Razzoli and Santa Maria.

History 
In antiquity, the Romans used the island. More recently, it was the site of some of the filming for Red Desert, released in 1964. For decades, the island had a series of private owners.

Budelli is especially renowned for its Spiaggia Rosa (Pink Beach), on the southeastern shoreline, which owes its colour to microscopic fragments of corals and shells, such as Miriapora truncata and Miniacina miniacea, and was featured in Antonioni’s 1964 film Il deserto rosso (The Red Desert). Budelli was one of four uninhabited islands in the Maddalena archipelago—the others being Caprera, Spargi and Razzoli. However, from 1989 to 2021, the island had a permanent caretaker, Mauro Morandi, who took over from a married couple.

Rules imposed as of the 1990s by La Maddalena NP have not allowed tourists to walk on the pink beach or swim in the sea; however, day trips by boat, as well as walking along a path behind the beach, were permitted.

In October 2013, the island was to be sold for €2.94 million to New Zealand businessman Michael Harte after the bankruptcy of the previous owner. Harte intended to protect the island's ecosystem. The government protested, and after a three year court battle, a judge in Sardinia reverted the island to the state, with the national park planning to use it for environmental education.

Inhabitants 
The sole former occupant of the island, Mauro Morandi, lived there from 1989 until his eviction in April 2021. To explain why he could not be allowed to live on the island indefinitely, the park's president said in 2016: "[He] symbolizes a man enchanted by the elements who decides to devote his life to contemplation and custody ... No one ignores his role in representing the historical memory of the place … But it's hard to find a contractual arrangement for a person in his position."

See also
 List of islands of Italy

References

External links 

Islands of Sardinia
Uninhabited islands of Italy